Tabrian (also Romanized as Ţabrīān, Tabarīan, Tabarīyān, and Tabryān; also known as Tabarīān-e Soflá) is a village in Faruj Rural District, in the Central District of Faruj County, North Khorasan Province, Iran. At the 2006 census, its population was 119, in 31 families.

References 

Populated places in Faruj County